Kennedy Polamalu (born November 22, 1963) is an American football coach and former player who currently is the running backs coach for the Las Vegas Raiders of the National Football League (NFL). He most recently served as the running backs coach for the Minnesota Vikings. He was the offensive coordinator for the UCLA Bruins. Prior to that he was the offensive coordinator for the USC Trojans.

College career
Polamalu was a fullback at USC from 1982 to 1985. His contributions helped the USC Trojans defeat the Ohio State Buckeyes, 20–17, in the 1985 Rose Bowl.

Coaching career

Early coaching career
Polamalu coached running backs and special teams for the USC Trojans from 2000 to 2003. He coached Justin Fargas, Hershel Dennis and Tom Malone. Prior to that he coached at the high school level and for University of California, Los Angeles (UCLA), San Diego State University and the University of Colorado at Boulder. He coached the Cleveland Browns in 2004 and the Jacksonville Jaguars from 2005 to 2009. On July 24, 2010, Polamalu accepted a position with USC to become the offensive coordinator. The hiring led Tennessee Titans coach Jeff Fisher to publicly criticize USC head coach, Lane Kiffin, for not following generally accepted National Football League (NFL) protocol: that the head coach or athletic department of the interested team should call the other head coach and let him know that he will be contacting an assistant on their staff.  Fisher was upset that Kiffin called and left a voicemail after Polamalu had already accepted the job.  Kiffin then explained that he called Polamalu on Friday, July 23, to gauge his interest; after getting Polamalu's positive answer on Saturday, Kiffin called Fisher and left a message.  On July 26, 2010, the Titans filed a lawsuit against Kiffin and USC for "maliciously luring" Polamalu away, asking for damages. On December 4, 2013, it was announced that Polamalu was hired to be the running backs coach at UCLA.

In July 2013, Polamalu decided to coach his son at Loyola High School in Los Angeles. He coached the running backs and was the Specials Team Coordinator. He only coached there for a year until he got an offer to coach at UCLA.

UCLA
On January 13, 2016, UCLA announced that it has promoted Polamalu to offensive coordinator. Following the loss to California on November 26, 2016, Polamalu's contract at UCLA was not renewed.

Vikings
In January 2017, the Minnesota Vikings officially announced the hiring of Polamalu as the team's running back coach. He was let go after the 2021 season.

Raiders
In 2022 he became the running backs coach for the Raiders.

Personal life
Polamalu is married to Diane Griffin and has three children K.C., Matthew, and Tre. He also has a daughter-in-law Theresa Pola and a grandson, Tre. He was born the day President Kennedy was assassinated, and was named in his honor. He graduated from Mater Dei High School in Santa Ana, California in 1982 where he also played football and was Student Class President his senior year.

Polamalu's brother, Aoatoa, played nose tackle at Penn State from 1984 to 1988.

Upon moving to California from American Samoa in the mid-1970s, Kennedy's family shortened their last name to Pola. In 2011, he began the process of legally changing it back to Polamalu while preparing for a return to Samoa. In June, he was part of a contingent that included former USC players Rey Maualuga, Deuce Lutui, Malaefou MacKenzie and others who returned to Samoa for a football camp sponsored by his nephew, former USC Trojans All-American and Pittsburgh Steelers safety Troy Polamalu.  His name change became official in August 2011.

References

External links
 UCLA profile

1963 births
Living people
American football fullbacks
American Samoan Roman Catholics
American sportspeople of Samoan descent
Cleveland Browns coaches
Colorado Buffaloes football coaches
High school football coaches in California
Jacksonville Jaguars coaches
San Diego State Aztecs football coaches
UCLA Bruins football coaches
USC Trojans football coaches
USC Trojans football players
People from Pago Pago
Players of American football from American Samoa
Players of American football from California
Las Vegas Raiders coaches